The Renault R24 is a Formula One car that competed in the 2004 Formula One season.

Design and development 
The chassis was designed by Mike Gascoyne, Bob Bell, Tim Densham and Dino Toso with Pat Symonds overseeing the design and production of the car as executive director of Engineering and Bernard Dudot leading the engine design.

R24B 
Renault brought a new updated R24B model to San Marino Grand Prix, featuring new cylinder heads, inlet system and related changes to the bottom part of the engine.

Racing history 
It was a car that showed speed and reliability during the season, managing to outpace both the Williams and McLaren, as well as proving to be a consistent challenger to the equally fast BAR Hondas of Jenson Button and Takuma Sato. However, it was routinely bested by the Ferrari F2004 of Michael Schumacher & Rubens Barrichello, as the Ferrari duo won 15 of the 18 races in 2004. The driver line-up was Jarno Trulli and Fernando Alonso.

The team became real contenders for second place in the Constructors' Championship. Trulli won the Monaco Grand Prix. However, his relationship with Renault (particularly with team principal and Trulli's ex-manager Flavio Briatore) deteriorated after he was consistently off the pace in the latter half of the year, and made claims of favouritism in the team towards Alonso (though the two teammates themselves remained friendly).

Commentators regularly point to the French Grand Prix as the final straw for Briatore, where Trulli was overtaken by Rubens Barrichello in the final stages of the last lap, costing Renault a double podium finish at their home Grand Prix. Trulli was later fired after failing to score points in 5 successive races. After that, he announced that he was joining Toyota F1 for the following year and in fact left Renault early, driving the Toyota in the last two races of the 2004 season.

Hoping to secure second place in the Constructors' Championship, Renault replaced Trulli with  World Champion Jacques Villeneuve for the final three races. However, Villeneuve — away from F1 racing for almost an entire season and struggling to acclimatise quickly to racing at the premier level — did not impress, and the team finished third behind Villeneuve's former team BAR with 105 points.

Renault used 'Mild Seven' logos, except at the Canadian, French and British Grands Prix.

Use in Top Gear 
The R24 was "loaned" to The Stig for an episode of Top Gear. Renault claimed it would go around the Top Gear Test Track in less than one minute; the R24 got around in 59.0 seconds. It was later revealed by Renault that the R24 was drove not by the regular Stig, but rather their test driver Heikki Kovalainen, disguised as the Stig.

Complete Formula One results
(key) (results in bold indicate pole position)

References

R24
2004 Formula One season cars